is a Japanese ultramarathon runner, bronze medalist at 2006 IAU 24-Hour Run World Championship, and team silver medalist at 2005 IAU 24-Hour Run World Championship.

In the Spartathlon in Greece, she finished 15 times from 1995 to 2011, taking the female 1st place 2 times (2004, 2005), female 2nd place 4 times (1997, 1998, 1999, 2001) and female 3rd place 3 times (1995, 1996, 2007). (Her name appears on the list in her maiden name of Kimie Funada before 2002)

International competitions

References

1952 births
Living people
Japanese ultramarathon runners
Japanese female long-distance runners
Japanese female marathon runners
Sportspeople from Hokkaido
Female ultramarathon runners
20th-century Japanese women
21st-century Japanese women